Hahn Air is a minor German airline headquartered in Dreieich, offering business jet scheduled and charter flights within Europe from its base at Düsseldorf Airport.

The company's core business, however, is a ticketing solution that gives travel agencies access to airlines via computer reservation systems and allows them to issue tickets on the Hahn Air HR-169 document. The company also offers distribution services for other airlines, such as tariff and flight plan transmission. Hahn Air has signed contracts with more than 350 air, rail and shuttle partners. Internationally, over 100,000 travel agencies use Hahn Air's services.

Hahn Air is a wholly owned subsidiary of Saspo Holding GmbH, with its headquarters in Dreieich near Frankfurt. The company is owned by Hans Nolte and Nikolaus Gormsen.

History

Early years 
Hahn Air was founded as a domestic German airline in 1994.
Its home base was the former Hahn US military air base (now Frankfurt-Hahn Airport), from which the company's name originates. In 1997, Hahn Air joined its first Billing and Settlement Plan (BSP) in Germany. The airline has the 2 letter code HR and the invoice number (IATA prefix code) 169. Hahn Air flights have been sold via the Amadeus computer reservation system since 1999.

That same year the first agreements were signed with airlines from Latin America, namely Aerolíneas Argentinas, Avianca, LAN Airlines and Varig, which formed the foundation for the ticketing platform. In 2001, Hahn Air became an IATA member and joined BSPs including France, the United Kingdom and Spain. Hahn Air also joined the Sabre, Galileo and Worldspan computer reservation systems. Further BSP memberships were concluded and, in 2003, the company's headquarters moved from Hahn to Dreieich, near Frankfurt am Main. One year later, Hahn Air became a member of the Airlines Reporting Corporation in the US and is represented together with its partners in the Abacus computer reservation system. The company's 100th interline agreement was also signed that year. In 2006, Hahn Air issued its first e-ticket and its first interline e-ticket on its computer reservation system. The same year, Hahn Air Systems was founded and offers Computer Reservation Services (CRS). The Hahn Air flight operations went through IOSA certification for the first time in 2007. The same year, Hahn Air entered the Japanese and Korean markets by connecting to the Axess, Infini and Topas reservation systems.

Development since 2010 
In 2010, it started operating flights twice a week between Düsseldorf and Luxembourg with a Cessna Citation CJ4. This route has been part of a codeshare with Luxair since 2011. Scheduled flights to and from Luxembourg can be booked by travel agencies worldwide. Since 2016 Hahn Air Lines also operates from the Egelsbach airport near Frankfurt am Main.

Due to a contract with Generali Insurance in 2010, travel agents are able to offer e-tickets via Hahn Air (HR-169) that include insurance in the event of an insolvency of the operating carrier. Since joining the Kosovo BSP in 2010, Hahn Air is present in all European markets.

Over the next several years, Hahn Air introduced further products, including the extended insolvency insurance Securtix and the distribution product e-alliance (H1-Air) for airlines with no or only limited GDS connectivity. It also opened The Aircraft at Burghof, the training and event location in Dreieich designed to look like an airplane. A distribution solution for rail and shuttle partners began under the name speed-alliance (5W-Rail&Shuttle). The first railway partner was the Austrian WESTbahn, followed by the Spanish rail operator RENFE in the summer of 2013. The Italian train company, NTV, joined in 2014. In 2012, Hahn Air established the Hahn Air Foundation. It offers financial support to social projects around the world, especially initiatives focused on disadvantaged women and children. HR Ventures, the venture capital company of the Hahn Air Group, was founded in the same year. It offers early-stage investments in disruptive technologies and scalable business models.

Development since 2015 
Hahn Air Systems signs its first shuttle partner, Tinker from the Netherlands, in 2015. Since the introduction of Securtix in 2010, over 30 million insolvency-safe tickets have been sold.
Hahn Air supports Interline Electronic Miscellaneous Documents (IEMDs). This service enables interline partners to offer ancillary services in markets where they do not participate in the local settlement system (BSP).

Destinations 
As of August 2022, Hahn Air offers charter flights within Europe.

Charter flights
Hahn Air has been offering charter flights since 2004. The purchase of a Cessna Citation Sovereign in 2015 has helped extend its reach to medium and long-distance routes. In 2016, the airline's charter business further expanded thanks to an additional Cessna Citation Sovereign aircraft.

Scheduled flights
As of November 2020, Hahn Air offered one single scheduled route which currently is no longer operated:

Germany
 Düsseldorf - Düsseldorf Airport base

Luxembourg
 Luxembourg - Luxembourg Findel Airport

Fleet 
As of January 2022, the Hahn Air fleet consists of the following aircraft:

References

External links
Official website

Airlines of Germany
Companies based in Hesse
Airlines established in 1994
German companies established in 1994